Jerry Richard Louis Marion (born August 7, 1944) is a former American football wide receiver who played one season with the Pittsburgh Steelers of the National Football League. He was drafted by the Pittsburgh Steelers in the tenth round of the 1966 NFL Draft. He was also drafted in the eleventh round of the 1966 AFL Redshirt Draft by the Boston Patriots of the American Football League. Marion played college football at the University of Wyoming and attended Bakersfield High School in Bakersfield, California. He is the father of NFL player Brock Marion.

References

External links
Just Sports Stats

Living people
1944 births
Players of American football from Bakersfield, California
American football wide receivers
African-American players of American football
Wyoming Cowboys football players
Pittsburgh Steelers players
21st-century African-American people
20th-century African-American sportspeople